Van Buren County is a county located in the U.S. state of Tennessee. As of the 2020 census, the population was 6,168, making it the second-least populous county in Tennessee. Its county seat is Spencer.

History

Van Buren County was formed in 1840 from parts of White, Warren and Bledsoe counties.  It was named for President Martin Van Buren.  The county seat, Spencer, was home to Burritt College, one of the South's first coeducational colleges, during the 19th and early 20th centuries.

Geography
The county straddles the western edge of the Cumberland Plateau, with the eastern portion of the county lying atop the Plateau, and the western portion lying on the lower Highland Rim. The Caney Fork, the county's primary drainage, forms part of its northern border with White County. The Rocky River, a tributary of the Caney Fork, forms part of the county's western border with Warren. Cane Creek, another tributary of the Caney Fork, drains the Fall Creek Falls area.

Big Bone Cave is located in the northwest corner of Van Buren County.  It is one of the best-known and most historic caverns in Tennessee.  It was mined by prehistoric Indians for gypsum and salts and was the site of the largest saltpeter mine in Tennessee during the War of 1812 and again during the American Civil War.  The cave is named for the discovery of the skeleton of a Giant Ground Sloth (Megalonyx jeffersoni) by saltpeter miners in 1811.  Many of the wooden saltpeter mining artifacts in the cave remain in a remarkable state of preservation, due to the extreme dryness of the cave.

Van Buren County boasts over 850 documented caves (over 3.09 caves per square mile), making it one of the most cave dense regions in the world (nearby White County has over 3.17 caves per square mile).

Adjacent counties
White County (north)
Cumberland County (northeast)
Bledsoe County (east)
Sequatchie County (south)
Warren County (west)

State protected areas

Big Bone Cave State Natural Area
Bledsoe State Forest (part)
Fall Creek Falls State Natural Area (part)
Fall Creek Falls State Resort Park (part)

Demographics

2020 census

As of the 2020 United States census, there were 6,168 people, 2,141 households, and 1,545 families residing in the county.

2010 census
As of the 2010 census, there were 5,548 people and 2,096 households in the county.  The population density was 20.3 people per square mile (8/km2).  There were 2,673 housing units at an average density of 9.8 per square mile (3/km2).  The racial makeup of the county was 97.5% White, 0.7% Black or African American, 0.3% Native American, 0.2% Asian, and 0.9% from two or more races.  0.9% of the population were Hispanic or Latino of any race.

There were 2,096 households, out of which 29.3% had children under the age of 18 living with them, 54.9% were married couples living together, 11.7% had a female householder with no husband present, and 28.0% were non-families. 24.3% of all households were made up of individuals, while 30.6% had someone living alone who was 65 years of age or older.  The average household size was 2.43.  82.6% of occupied housing units were owner-occupied, meaning that 17.4% were renter-occupied.

In the county, the population was spread out, with 23.2% up to the age of 19, 8.8% from 20 to 29, 12.4% from 30 to 39, 13.4% from 40 to 49, 16.8% from 50 to 59, 14.7% from 60 to 69, and 10.7% who were 70 years of age or older.  The median age was 44.5 years.  Women make up 50.2% of the population.

The median income for a household in the county was $29,087. The per capita income for the county was $17,160.  24.6% of the population were below the poverty line.

Recreation
Van Buren County is home to a portion of Fall Creek Falls State Resort Park.

Communities

Town
Spencer (county seat)

Unincorporated communities
Bone Cave
Cedar Grove

Education
Van Buren County Schools operates public schools.

Politics
For many decades, Van Buren county was a reliably Democratic county at the presidential level, voting for the Democratic candidate for president in all but two elections from 1880 to 2004. This trend has reversed dramatically in recent years, with Republican candidates winning the county in each of the past four elections. In 2020, Republican Donald Trump won the highest share of the vote for a Republican presidential candidate ever in Van Buren County, earning 80.2% of the vote.

See also
National Register of Historic Places listings in Van Buren County, Tennessee

References

External links

UT Extension office 
Van Buren County Chamber of Commerce
Van Buren County Schools
TNGenWeb

 
1840 establishments in Tennessee
Populated places established in 1840
Counties of Appalachia
Middle Tennessee